The Friendly's Classic was a golf tournament on the LPGA Tour from 1995 to 1998. It was played at Crestview Country Club in Agawam, Massachusetts.

Winners
1998 Amy Fruhwirth
1997 Deb Richard
1996 Dottie Pepper
1995 Becky Iverson

References

External links
Crestview Country Club

1995 establishments in Massachusetts
1998 disestablishments in Massachusetts
Agawam, Massachusetts
Former LPGA Tour events
Golf in Massachusetts
History of Hampden County, Massachusetts
Recurring sporting events established in 1995
Recurring sporting events disestablished in 1998
Sports competitions in Massachusetts
Sports in Hampden County, Massachusetts
Tourist attractions in Hampden County, Massachusetts
History of women in Massachusetts